The 1975 Campeonato Nacional de Futbol Profesional was Chilean top tier's 43rd season. Unión Española was the tournament's champion, winning its fourth title.

Standings

Scores

Relegation play-off

Magallanes relegated to 1976 Segunda División

Topscorer

Liguilla Pre-Copa Libertadores

See also 
 1975 Copa Chile

References

External links 
ANFP 
RSSSF Chile 1975

Primera División de Chile seasons
Chile
Prim